The Food of the Gods and How It Came to Earth is a science fiction novel by H. G. Wells, first published in 1904. Wells called it "a fantasia on the change of scale in human affairs. . . . I had hit upon [the idea] while working out the possibilities of the near future in a book of speculations called Anticipations (1901)." There have been various B-movie adaptations. The novel is about a group of scientists who invent a food that accelerates the growth of children and turns them into giants when they become adults.

Plot summary
The Food of the Gods is divided into three "books": "Book I:  The Discovery of the Food"; "Book II: The Food in the Village"; and "Book III: The Harvest of the Food".

Book I
Book I begins with satirical remarks on "scientists", then introduces Mr. Bensington, a research chemist specialising in "the More Toxic Alkaloids", and Professor Redwood, who after studying reaction times takes an interest in "Growth".  Redwood's suggestion "that the process of growth probably demanded the presence of a considerable quantity of some necessary substance in the blood that was only formed very slowly" causes Bensington to begin searching for such a substance. After a year of research and experiment, he finds a way to make what he calls in his initial enthusiasm "the Food of the Gods", but later more soberly dubs Herakleophorbia IV. Their first experimental success is with chickens that grow to about six times their normal size on an experimental farm at Hickleybrow, near Urshot in Kent (where H. G. Wells was born and grew up).

Unfortunately Mr. and Mrs. Skinner, the slovenly couple hired to feed and monitor the chickens, allow Herakleophorbia IV to enter the local food chain, and the other creatures that get the food grow to six or seven times their normal size: not only plants, but also wasps, earwigs, and rats. The chickens escape, overrunning a nearby town. Bensington and Redwood, impractical researchers, do nothing until a decisive and efficient "well-known civil engineer" of their acquaintance named Cossar arrives to organize a party of eight to ("Obviously!") destroy the wasps' nest, hunt down the monstrous vermin, and burn the experimental farm to the ground.

As debate ensues about the substance, popularly known as "Boomfood", children are being given the substance and grow to enormous size: Redwood's son ("pioneer of the new race"), Cossar's three sons, and Mrs. Skinner's grandson, Caddles.  A certain Dr. Winkles makes the substance available to a princess, and there are other giants as well. These massive offspring eventually reach about 40 feet in height. At first the giants are tolerated, but as they grow more and more, restrictions are imposed.

With time, most of the English population comes to resent the young giants, as well as changes to flora, fauna, and the organisation of society that become more extensive with each passing year. Bensington is nearly lynched by an angry mob, and subsequently retires from active life to Mount Glory Hydrotherapeutic Hotel.

Book II
Book II offers an account of the development of Mrs. Skinner's grandson, Albert Edward Caddles, as an epitome of "the coming of Bigness in the world." Wells takes the occasion to satirize the conservative rural gentry (Lady Wondershoot) and Church of England clergy (the Vicar of Cheasing Eyebright) in describing life in a backward little village.

Book III
Book III begins with a chapter entitled "The Altered World" that dramatizes how life has changed by portraying the shocked reaction of a Rip van Winkle-like character released from prison after being incarcerated for 20 years. British society has learned to cope with occasional outbreaks of giant pests (mosquitoes, spiders, rats, etc.), but the coming to maturity of the giant children brings a rabble-rousing politician, Caterham - nicknamed "Jack the Giant Killer" - into power. Caterham has been promoting a program to destroy the Food of the Gods and hinting that he will suppress the giants, and now begins to execute his plan.

By coincidence, it is just at this moment that Caddles rebels against spending his life working in a chalk pit and sets out to see the world. In London, he is surrounded by thousands of tiny people and confused by everything he sees. He demands to know what it is all for and where he fits in, but no one can answer his questions; after refusing to return to his chalk pit, Caddles is shot and killed by the police.

The conclusion of the novel features a tenderly described romance between the young giant Redwood and the unnamed princess. Their love blossoms just as Caterham, who has at last attained a position of power, launches an effort to suppress the giants. But after two days of fighting, the giants, who have taken refuge in an enormous pit, have held their own. Their bombardment of London with shells containing large quantities of Herakleophorbia IV forces Caterham to call a truce. The British leader is satirized as a demagogue, a "vote-monster" for whom nothing but "gatherings, and caucuses, and votes – above all votes" are real.

Caterham employs Redwood père as an envoy to send a proposed settlement, whose terms would demand that the giants live apart somewhere and forgo the right to reproduce. The offer is indignantly rejected at a meeting of the giants, where one of Cossar's sons expresses a belief in growth as part of the law of life:  "We fight not for ourselves but for growth, growth that goes on for ever.  Tomorrow, whether we live or die, growth will conquer through us.  That is the law of the spirit for evermore.  To grow according to the will of God!" The novel concludes with the world on the verge of a long struggle between the "little people" and the Children of the Food, whose ultimate victory is perhaps suggested by the novel's final image:  "For one instant [a son of Cossar] shone, looking up fearlessly into the starry deeps, mail-clad, young and strong, resolute and still. Then the light had passed and he was no more than a great black outline against the starry sky, a great black outline that threatened with one mighty gesture the firmament of heaven and all its multitude of stars."

Film, TV and theatrical adaptations
Bert I. Gordon adapted the work to the movies twice.  First, he wrote, produced, and directed (for Embassy Pictures) Village of the Giants (1965). In this film, the substance, called simply "Goo", is developed by an 11-year-old Ron Howard. This is consumed by a gang of teenaged troublemakers (led by Beau Bridges) who become giants and take over the town, turning the tables on the knee-high adults. They are eventually defeated by other teens (led by Tommy Kirk).

The Food of the Gods was released by American International Pictures in 1976, again written, produced, and directed by Gordon. Based on a portion of the book, it reduced the tale to an 'Ecology Strikes Back' scenario, common in science fiction movies at the time. The movie was not very successful. However, it did receive a Golden Turkey Award for Worst Rodent Movie of All Time, beating such competitors as The Killer Shrews (1959), The Mole People (1956), The Nasty Rabbit (1965), and Night of the Lepus (1972).

In 1989, Gnaw: Food of the Gods, Part 2 was released, written by Richard Bennett and directed by Damian Lee. Dealing with a pack of giant lab rats wreaking havoc on a college campus, it was even further removed from the book than Gordon's attempts.

Comic book adaptions
The Food of the Gods was first adapted for the comics in January 1961, for Classics Illustrated #160, with a painted cover by Gerald McCann, script by Alfred Sundel and interior artwork by Tony Tallarico. The giant wasps were depicted in only two panels and the giant rats do not appear at all.

A more dynamic and dramatic version, "told in the mighty Marvel manner," was found in Marvel Classics Comics #22 (Marvel Comics 1977). Writer Doug Moench greatly improved on the Classics Illustrated script, while Sonny Trinidad produced new artwork.

"Deadly Muffins" in Secrets of Sinister House #13 (DC Comics 1973) is an uncredited version of the story written by John Albano and drawn by Alfredo Alcala.

See also

 Dr. Ox's Experiment by Jules Verne

References

External links

 

1904 British novels
1904 science fiction novels
Novels by H. G. Wells
British science fiction novels
Fiction about size change
Macmillan Publishers books
Fictional food and drink
Fiction about giants
British novels adapted into films
Novels adapted into comics
Science fiction novels adapted into films